Anthidium friesei is a species of bee in the family Megachilidae, the leaf-cutter, carder, or mason bees.

Synonyms
Synonyms for this species include:
Anthidium flavomaculatum, Cockerell, 1911
Anthidium flavomaculatum_homonym Friese, 1908
Anthidium mendocinum Friese, 1917

References

friesei
Insects described in 1911